Shatangwan Subdistrict is an urban subdistrict in Lengshuijiang, Hunan Province, People's Republic of China.

Administrative division
The subdistrict is divided into 12 villages and 12 communities, the following areas: 
 Liuxi Community
 Lubu Community
 Shatangwan Community
 Wangpingwan Community
 Changpu Community
 Dongzhan Community
 Community
 Community
 Community
 Community
 Community
 Community
 Taiping Village
 Xinmin Village
 Changpu Village
 Liuxi Village
 Huaping Village
 Gangxi Village
 Xiaoheng Village
 Maoyi Village
 Qingyi Village
 Qingtang Village
 Dazhou Village
 Qunfeng Village

Geography
Zi River, also known as the mother river, flows through the subdistrict.

Transportation

Railway
The Shanghai–Kunming railway passes through the middle of the subdistrict.

Provincial Highway
The Provincial Highway S312, commonly abbreviated as "S312", traveling through the subdistrict.

References

Divisions of Lengshuijiang